Grenville Secondary School is a co-educational institution located in Grenville, St. Andrews parish, Grenada. Founded in 1983, it has a student population of 400 to 500 students and a teaching staff of over 20. The school's motto is 'Together We Build in Love' (Latin: Una Amore Aedificare).

History
On September 9, 1983, the Grenville Secondary School opened as Jeremiah Richardson Secondary School, with 116 students and six staff. Within a month, the school's enrollment had increased to 186. Stephen Wall was the school's first principal.

References

External links

Schools in Grenada
Educational institutions established in 1983
1983 establishments in Grenada